"In Sickness and in Health" is the fourth episode of the NBC horror anthology Fear Itself. The episode guest-starred Psych co-stars Maggie Lawson and James Roday.

Plot
Samantha (Maggie Lawson) is about to be married to Carlos (James Roday), a man whom she loves deeply despite the fact that she has only known him for a short while. She suspects that many people—including her lifelong friends/bridesmaids Kelly and Ruthie—think that she is rushing the marriage. Samantha's brother, Steven, hasn't shown up yet; Samantha explains that he is just upset since she is the only family he has. Ruthie passes Samantha a note that was given to her from Father Chris (William B. Davis), the reverend. Samantha is told it was given to him by a woman in a red headscarf. She opens the letter and finds a typewritten note which reads: "The person you are marrying is a serial killer."

She meets Carlos and finds that she can't relax around him. Samantha and Carlos get married, despite some hesitation during the ceremony. Preparing for the reception, Samantha tries to assure her friends that nothing has changed, even though they both notice something is wrong. Stressed, she asks them to leave. Alone, she hears a knock on the door. She goes out and glimpses a person leaving, wearing a red headscarf. She meets with Father Chris and asks him who gave him the note. He alludes to a tragedy in Carlos' past that she has not been aware of. She talks with Bob (Marshall Bell), Carlos' uncle, who explains that Carlos' parents mysteriously disappeared when he was sixteen, which traumatized him.

Samantha leaves a voicemail for Steven; confrontations ensue between Carlos, the bridesmaids, and Samantha. Carlos questions her about the note. When she asks if there is anything he wants to tell her, he responds by laughing, tells her not to be scared and starts to advance on her. Samantha retreats into a confessional booth and Carlos tries to coax her out. Without warning, he enters the other half of the booth. Samantha tries to escape but finds that it is blocked. Carlos tells her about a woman who started stalking him and might have been crazy enough to want to ruin their wedding.

Elsewhere, the person in the red scarf enters a room filled with human heads in jars and bloody corpses. After depositing a dead cat on a table, then checking the voicemail, left by Samantha, the person is revealed to be Samantha's brother Steven, dressed as a woman. Carlos asks if they can just forget about the note but Samantha reveals that Father Chris accidentally told Ruthie to give the note to the wrong person; the note was not intended for her, but for him. Carlos says he doesn't want to know what it says so as long as they're together, and that "You'll show me when you're ready, promise?" to which Samantha looks at him strangely and eerily replies "I promise."

Reception 
Multiple reviews of the episode noted that it ended with more questions than answers, such as The AV Club questioning "Why does she look so frightened if she’s the one who’s in control?". Slant felt that the episode's initial conceit of a woman receiving a note stating that she was marrying a serial killer could have been "a pretty good hook for a Hitchcockian melodrama along the lines of Suspicion were Salva actually interested in telling that particular story" but that "it quickly becomes obvious that the whole thing is just a setup for a lame and illogical twist ending."

Dread Central was critical in their review, as they felt that "this series continues to demonstrate the biggest fault of Masters of Horror: Horror anthologies are best suited to half-hour episodes a la Tales From The Crypt instead of the bloated hour-long format."

References

External links
 

2008 American television episodes